Nikola Trajković (born 5 January 1981) is a Serbian football manager and former player. Currently, Trajković is the assistant manager of the Swedish football club Malmö FF. 

After a breakthrough season with Zeta, Trajković was transferred to Red Star Belgrade in July 2005, alongside Milanko Rašković, on a four-year deal. He helped the club win back-to-back championship titles in 2006 and 2007, as well as two national cups.

In 2005, Trajković was capped twice for Serbia and Montenegro.

Honours
Red Star Belgrade
 Serbian SuperLiga: 2005–06, 2006–07
 Serbian Cup: 2005–06, 2006–07
Győr
 Nemzeti Bajnokság I: 2012–13
 Szuperkupa: 2013

References

External links
 
 
 
 

Association football midfielders
Expatriate football managers in Norway
Expatriate footballers in Greece
Expatriate footballers in Hungary
First League of Serbia and Montenegro players
FK Čukarički players
FK Kolubara players
Footballers from Belgrade
Győri ETO FC players
Nemzeti Bajnokság I players
Red Star Belgrade footballers
Serbia and Montenegro footballers
Serbia and Montenegro international footballers
Serbian expatriate football managers
Serbian expatriate footballers
Serbian expatriate sportspeople in Greece
Serbian expatriate sportspeople in Hungary
Serbian expatriate sportspeople in Norway
Serbian football managers
Serbian footballers
Serbian SuperLiga players
Super League Greece players
Thrasyvoulos F.C. players
1981 births
Living people
Flekkerøy IL managers